The Marriage Lie is a 1918 American silent drama film directed by Stuart Paton and starring Carmel Myers, Kenneth Harlan and Harry Carter. Prints and/or fragments were found in the Dawson Film Find in 1978.

Cast
 Carmel Myers as Eileen Orton 
 Kenneth Harlan as Douglas Seward 
 Harry Carter as Terence Carver 
 William Quinn as 'Parson' Dye 
 Joseph W. Girard as Jim Orton

References

Bibliography
 Leonhard Gmür. Rex Ingram: Hollywood's Rebel of the Silver Screen. 2013.

External links
 

1918 films
1918 drama films
1910s English-language films
American silent feature films
Silent American drama films
American black-and-white films
Films directed by Stuart Paton
Universal Pictures films
1910s American films